The Backward Class is a 2014 Canadian documentary film directed by Madeleine Grant. The film follows the success of a group of ethnically disadvantaged students near Bangalore, India, in taking high-school graduation exams. The film, created by a group of graduates of the University of British Columbia, premiered at the Hot Docs Canadian International Documentary Festival in May 2014 and won the Audience Favourite award.

The 91-minute documentary was shot inside the Shanti Bhavan school, by Affinity Films. Grant lived and worked at the school while making the film. The dialogue is partly in English and partly in Tamil with English subtitles.

The film was later screened in Toronto, received positive reviews from Now Magazine and The Globe and Mail.

One of the stars of the film, Mala Muniswamy, travelled from India to attend the film's premiere.

References

External links

2014 films
Canadian documentary films
2014 documentary films
Documentary films about India
Documentary films about high school
Colleges in Bangalore
Films set in Bangalore
Films shot in Bangalore
2010s Canadian films